Quinn Puketahinga Claude Tupaea (born 10 May 1999) is a New Zealand professional rugby union player who plays as a centre for New Zealand province Waikato. In his youth career, he was selected to play in the 2019 World Rugby Under 20 Championships for New Zealand and took part in Hamilton Boys' High School first XV, the top representative team in secondary school.

Early life 
Quinn Tupaea was born on 10 May 1999 in Hamilton, the son of Brent and Kelly Tupaea.  He attended Southwell School and Hamilton Boys' High School.

Professional career

Waikato 
In May 2018, Waikato signed Tupaea for their 2018 Mitre 10 Cup season at 19 years old. He made his first professional team debut when he made the match-day fifteen at centre during the opening match against Manawatu at Central Energy Trust Arena. Tupaea became a regular starter, starting in eleven from twelve appearences and scoring seven tries. He also was a part of Waikato's historic Ranfurly Shield victory over Taranaki and their impressive top of the table finish. Tupaea finished sixth equal as leading try scorer in the Mitre 10 Cup, including scoring a brace of tries against Bay of Plenty and Northland. At seasons end, he achieved championship success after defeating Otago in order to gain promotion back into the top division and was awarded Emerging Player of the Year at the Waikato Rugby awards.

In an ultimately disappointing 2019 Mitre 10 Cup season for Waikato, in which the team narrowly avoided relegation to the Championship, Tupaea was a standout player for both Waikato and among all of the Mitre 10 Cup players. He proved to be one of the most consistently high performing centres in the competition, finishing 5th on the try-scoring table, with 7 tries in 9 games.

Chiefs 

On the back of the 2019 Mitre 10 Cup season, Tupaea was announced in the Chiefs Super Rugby squad for the 2020 Super Rugby season, at the age of 20.

International career 

Statistics 

Updated: 12 June 2022
Source: Quinn P C Tupaea Rugby History

List of international test tries 

Updated: 12 June 2022
Source: Quinn P C Tupaea Statsguru

References

External links
 
 Quinn Tupaea at All Blacks.com

1999 births
New Zealand rugby union players
Rugby union centres
Living people
Waikato rugby union players
Chiefs (rugby union) players
New Zealand international rugby union players
Rugby union players from Hamilton, New Zealand